The Dubai Design and Fashion Council (DDFC) was established as per Decree No. (23) of 2013 issued by Sheikh Mohammed bin Rashid Al Maktoum, Vice President and Prime Minister of the United Arab Emirates and ruler of Dubai.

Overview
The Council was set up as a joint effort of the Dubai Executive Council and the Dubai Technology and Media Free Zone Authority (now Dubai Creative Clusters Authority) to develop a road map for the design and fashion industry. One of the Council's initial mandate was to deliver a comprehensive strategy outlining and guiding the growth and development of Dubai’s fashion industry.  Nez Gebreel is the CEO of Dubai Design and Fashion Council.

The Council helps in connecting talent to their core market through guidance and access to the best business minds in the creative industry. It supports designers in putting together the business model, attracting funds and sourcing manufacturing and production units. Members of the Council board — a mix of corporate and creative individuals — are on hand to help. The council also works towards the development of Intellectual Property laws in the region and implementation through the education of its members and the community. 

In October 2015, the Council released the MENA Design Outlook 2015 Report, offering a comprehensive analysis of the Middle East's design industry. In May 2016, it released the MENA Design Education Outlook Report, which provides an insight into the design education landscape of the MENA region. The MENA Design Education Outlook focuses on six key design markets in the region including the UAE, Qatar, Lebanon, Jordan and Kuwait.

Part of the Council's mandate is also to start a design school in the region.

DDFC board members
The following are board members:

 Dr. Amina Al Rustamani, Group Chief Executive Officer, TECOM Group (Chairperson of the Board)  
 Laila Suhail, CEO, Dubai Festival and Retail Establishments (Vice Chairperson) 
 Mohammad Al Shael, CEO, Business Development and Strategy Sector, at Department of Economic Development
 Peter Van Wyk, Senior Director Development, Hospitality at Emaar
 Ahmed Ismael, CEO, Majed Al Futtaim Ventures
 Khalid Al Tayer, CEO – Retail, Al Tayer Group
 Ashok Sawlani, Former Chairman of & Current Honorary Member of Managing Committee, Dubai Textile City
 Farida Abdulla Kambar Al Awadi, President, Association of Professional Interior Designers in UAE (APID) and Managing Director, Cinmar Design
 Reem Acra, founder and CEO of Reem Acra
 Ali Jaber, Dean of Communication and Information Studies, Mohammed Bin Rashid School of Communication at American University of Dubai
 Patrick Chalhoub, CEO, Chalhoub Group
 Raja Trad, CEO, Leo Burnett and Publicis Group of Companies MENA
 Ghassan Harfouche, Group CEO, Middle East Communication Network (MCN)
 Nisha Jagtiani, Director of Landmark Group
 Azza Fahmy, Chairwoman and Chief Designer, Azza Fahmy Jewellery

References

External links
 Mena Design Outlook 2015
 Mena Design Education Outlook 2016 
 Official website

2013 establishments in the United Arab Emirates
Organizations established in 2013
Organisations based in Dubai
Design institutions
Fashion organizations
Culture in Dubai
Emirati design